Madrepora corymbosa is an unaccepted scientific name and may refer to two species of corals:
 Acropora cytherea as described by Lamarck, 1816
 Lobophyllia corymbosa as described by Forskål, 1775